Ren Narita (成田 蓮 Narita Ren, born November 29, 1997) is a Japanese professional wrestler currently signed to New Japan Pro-Wrestling (NJPW) where he is in his first reign as NEVER Openweight 6-Man Tag Team Champion with Minoru Suzuki and El Desperado.

Early life
Narita has played several sports before becoming a wrestler, including baseball and kendo.

Professional wrestling career

New Japan Pro Wrestling (2017–present)

Young Lion (2017–2019) 
Narita was trained under New Japan Pro-Wrestling's (NJPW) "young lion" system. Narita made his professional wrestling debut for NJPW's developmental territory Lion's Gate Project, where he wrestled Shota Umino to a ten minute time limit draw at the Lion's Gate Project 7 event on July 4, 2017. Later that month, Narita had his second match, teaming with Umino where they lost to El Desperado and Zack Sabre Jr. of Suzuki-gun on day eight of the 2017 G1 Climax tournament.

Narita competed in the 11th Young Lion Cup, gaining 1 point after a time limit draw against Tetsuhiro Yagi. During the following year, Narita wrestled several tag team matches with NJPW veterans. In May 2019, after Flip Gordon pulled out of the Best of the Super Juniors 26 tournament, Narita was announced as a last minute replacement. He ended the tournament with a final standing of 0 points. Throughout the Destruction tour in September, Narita took part in the 12th Young Lion Cup. He finished with a record of 5-2. Afterwards, it was announced that he was heading to America for his excursion and joining The LA Dojo.

Excursion to United States (2019–2022) 
Narita wrestled his first match in the United States at Fighting Spirit Unleashed Boston, losing to Lance Archer. Narita earnt his first win in the states, defeating fellow LA Dojo teammate Alex Coughlin, in November at NJPW Showdown in San Jose. In March 2020, New Japan suspended all of its activities, due to the COVID-19 pandemic, causing American-based talent to not be able to travel to compete. Therefore, Narita appeared primarily on New Japan's new American-based show NJPW Strong. In March 2021, Narita competed in the New Japan Cup USA tournament, defeating Misterioso in the qualifying round. In the first round, Narita lost to eventual winner, Tom Lawlor. In July, Narita teamed with Yuji Nagata to compete in the Tag Team Turbulence tournament, where they defeated Fred Yehi and Wheeler Yuta, in the first round. In the second round, the duo lost to eventual winners, the Good Brothers. In September, at Autumn Attack, Narita challenged Tom Lawlor for the Strong Openweight Championship, in a losing effort. In November at Battle in the Valley, Narita lost to Will Ospreay. After La Dojo head-coach Katsuyori Shibata returned from injury on the finals of the G1 Climax 31, he announced he would compete in a match at Wrestle Kingdom 16 against a mystery opponent. At said event on January 4, 2022, Shibata's opponent was revealed to be Narita, who Shibata defeated. Narita returned to compete on NJPW Strong until September, defeating Juice Robinson in his final match.

Return from excursion (2022–present) 
Narita returned from his excursion, in October at Declaration of Power, teaming with Robbie Eagles and David Finlay, to defeat Suzuki-gun. Later in the month, Narita competed in a 16-man tournament, to crown the inaugural NJPW World Television Champion, in the first round Narita achieved a shock victory over Tomohiro Ishii. He then went on to defeat established heavyweight wrestlers, such as Toru Yano and Sanada, thus advancing to the finals at Wrestle Kingdom 17, where he would face Zack Sabre Jr. At Wrestle Kingdom, Narita was defeated in the tournament final by Sabre Jr.

All Elite Wrestling (2021)
Narita appeared on the May 12, 2021 edition of AEW Dynamite, where he accompanied Yuji Nagata for his IWGP United States Heavyweight Championship match vs champion Jon Moxley. On the May 24, 2021 episode of AEW Dark: Elevation, as part of the partnership between New Japan Pro Wrestling and All Elite Wrestling (AEW), Narita made his in-ring debut for the promotion defeating Royce Isaacs.

Championships and accomplishments
New Japan Pro-Wrestling
NEVER Openweight 6-Man Tag Team Championship (1 time, current) – with El Desperado and Minoru Suzuki
Pro Wrestling Illustrated
Ranked No. 428 of the top 500 singles wrestlers in the PWI 500 in 2021

References

External links
 

1997 births
Living people
People from Aomori (city)
Japanese male professional wrestlers